Gyula Nagy (7 April 1924 – 10 March 1996), also referred to as Jules Nagy, was a former Hungarian football player and manager.

Born in Szob, Nagy began his career with Vasas SC and then joined France where he played for numerous clubs. He had a spell of two years with Fiorentina. When he was still a player he began a coaching career with FC Metz, and also coached SC Bastia and FC Sète.

External links and references

External links
 Profile at So Foot
 
 

1924 births
1996 deaths
Association football midfielders
Association football forwards
Hungarian footballers
Hungarian expatriate footballers
Vasas SC players
Expatriate footballers in France
Expatriate footballers in Italy
Ligue 1 players
Serie A players
ACF Fiorentina players
Ligue 2 players
FC Sète 34 players
Grenoble Foot 38 players
Olympique Alès players
FC Metz players
Racing Besançon players
Hungarian football managers
FC Metz managers
SC Bastia managers
FC Sète 34 managers
SR Colmar players
AS Béziers Hérault (football) players
CO Roubaix-Tourcoing players
People from Szob
Sportspeople from Pest County